Zelleromyces cinnabarinus is a North American gasteroid fungus species in the family Russulaceae with a cinnabar-red peridium. It is the type species of Zelleromyces, and like other members of its genus, it should probably be transferred to the genus Lactarius which it belongs to phylogenetically. It was described from a collection made under pine near Baton Rouge, Louisiana.

References

External links

 (with detailed description from original publication)

Fungi described in 1960
Fungi of North America
Russulales